Mike Brown (born April 7, 1999) is an American football safety for the Tennessee Titans of the National Football League (NFL). He played college football at Miami University and was signed by the Minnesota Vikings as an undrafted free agent in 2022. He has also been a member of the Green Bay Packers and Cleveland Browns.

Professional career

Minnesota Vikings
After going unselected in the 2022 NFL Draft, the Minnesota Vikings signed Brown as an undrafted free agent. He was waived at the final roster cuts, on August 30, 2022.

Green Bay Packers
On September 14, 2022, the Green Bay Packers signed Brown to their practice squad, then released him on September 22.

Minnesota Vikings (second stint)
On October 5, 2022, Brown was signed to the Minnesota Vikings practice squad. He was released two weeks later.

Cleveland Browns
Brown received a tryout from the Cleveland Browns in October 2022, and was signed to the practice squad on October 25. He was elevated to the active roster for the Browns' week 11 game against the Buffalo Bills, where he made his professional debut in the loss, appearing on 16 special teams snaps. He was placed back on the practice squad the next day. He was later elevated again to the active roster, playing in the Browns' week 13 and 14 games, before being placed back on the practice squad. Brown appeared in three games for the Browns.

Tennessee Titans
On January 2, 2023, the Tennessee Titans signed Brown to their 53-man roster from the Browns' practice squad.

References

External links
Tennessee Titans bio
Miami RedHawks bio

1999 births
Living people
American football safeties
Players of American football from Michigan
Sportspeople from Grand Rapids, Michigan
Miami RedHawks football players
Cleveland Browns players
Green Bay Packers players
Minnesota Vikings players
Tennessee Titans players